René Lamps (5 November 1915 - 8 May 2007) was a French politician. He began his career as a schoolteacher, and he served in the French Resistance during World War II. He served as a member of the National Assembly from 1945 to 1958, and from 1962 to 1978, representing Somme. He was also the mayor of Amiens from 1971 to 1983.

References

1915 births
2007 deaths
People from Amiens
Mayors of places in Hauts-de-France
French Communist Party politicians
Members of the Constituent Assembly of France (1945)
Members of the Constituent Assembly of France (1946)
Deputies of the 1st National Assembly of the French Fourth Republic
Deputies of the 2nd National Assembly of the French Fourth Republic
Deputies of the 3rd National Assembly of the French Fourth Republic
Deputies of the 2nd National Assembly of the French Fifth Republic
Deputies of the 3rd National Assembly of the French Fifth Republic
Deputies of the 4th National Assembly of the French Fifth Republic
Deputies of the 5th National Assembly of the French Fifth Republic
Communist members of the French Resistance